Bong ( is a hamlet in the Dutch province of Limburg. It is located in the municipality of Peel en Maas, about 1 km west of Baarlo.

References

Populated places in Limburg (Netherlands)
Peel en Maas